Adelaide United Football Club – an association club based in Adelaide, South Australia – was founded in 2003, becoming the first southern member admitted into the A-League. The club's first team has competed in numerous nationally and internationally organised competitions, and all players who have played in 100 or more such matches are listed below.

Key
The list is ordered first by date of debut, and then if necessary in alphabetical order.
Appearances as a substitute are included.
Statistics are correct up to and including the match played on 11 March 2023. Where a player left the club permanently after this date, his statistics are updated to his date of leaving.

Players

Players highlighted in bold are still actively playing at Adelaide United.

Captains
Eight players have captained Adelaide United since it was founded in 2003, first being Ross Aloisi, who captained the team for Adelaide United's first two seasons. The club's longest-serving captain is Eugene Galekovic, who captained the club for 7 years between 2011 and 2017. The current captain is Craig Goodwin, who took over from Stefan Mauk  in 2022 who left the club.

References
General
 
 
 

Specific

Adelaide United FC players
Adelaide United
Players
Association football player non-biographical articles